This is a list of television programs formerly and currently broadcast by the Canadian television channel MTV Canada and its former incarnation as talktv.

Programming
This a list of programs currently being broadcast.

Current

Regular programming

A-E

 Catfish: The TV Show

F-J
 Faking It
 Finding Carter
 Friendzone
 Generation Cryo
 Geordie Shore
 Girl Code
 Grand Benders
 Happyland

K-O
 Kesha: My Crazy Beautiful Life
 Losing It
 McMorris & McMorris
 MTV Creeps
 MTV Cribs

P-T
 Panic Button
 Play With AJ
 Ridiculousness
 Scrubbing In
 The Shannara Chronicles
 Snack-Off
 Snooki & JWoww
 Teen Mom
 Teen Mom 2
 Teen Mom 3
 Teen Wolf

U-Z
 Virgin Territory

Special programming
 MTV Europe Music Awards
 MTV Movie Awards
 MTV Video Music Awards
 We Day

Acquired
 Breaker High (currently on MTV2)
 Clueless
 InnerSPACE (Space show)
 Malcolm In The Middle
 Movie Night (E! Canada show)
 Sabrina The Teenage Witch
 Saved by the Bell
 South Park
 Student Bodies

Past

Regular programming

0-9
 16 and Pregnant
 4REAL
 8th & Ocean

A-E
 Adventures in Hollyhood
 After Degrassi
 The After Show
 At the Movies with Ebert & Roeper (talktv)
 Balance-Television for Living Well (talktv)
 Bam's Unholy Union
 Beavis and Butt-Head
 Buckwild
 Buzzin'
 Camilla Scott Show (talktv)
 Canada's Next Top Model
 Celebrity Pets (talktv)
 The Chatroom (talktv)
 Cheyenne
 The City
 Clone High
 Comedy Now!
 DanceLife
 Diary
 The Dini Petty Show (talktv)
 Engaged and Underage
 eTalk (talktv)
 eTalk Daily Profiles (talktv)

F-J
 Failosophy
 Fat Camp
 From G's to Gents
 The Hills
 The Hills: The After Show
 The Jack Benny Program (talktv)
 Jersey Shore
 Juvies
 I'm From Rolling Stone
 Impact

K-O
 The Kentucky Kid
 Keys to the VIP
 Laguna Beach: The After Show
 Laguna Beach: The Real Orange County
 Life of Ryan
 Live It Up! (talktv)
 Live with Regis and Kelly (talktv)
 Living Lahaina
 Living on the Edge
 Made
 Making the Band
 Making the Video
 Man and Wife
 Mason Lee: On The Edge (talktv)
 Maui Fever
 Me & Mr. Jones
 Meet the Barkers
 Miss Seventeen
 MTV e2
 MTV Live
 MTV Live Hacked
 MTV News
 MTV Presents
 MTV Screen
 MTV Show Choir
 MTV Showtown
 MTV's The 70s House
 My Super Sweet 16
 Never Ever Do This At Home
 Newlyweds: Nick and Jessica
 Newport Harbor: The Real Orange County
 Next

P-T
 Pageant Place
 Pamela Wallin's TalkTV (talktv)
 The Paper
 Parental Control
 Peak Season
 Person to Person (talktv)
 Pimp My Ride
 Pranked!
 Punk'd
 The Real World
 Real World/Road Rules Challenge
 Road Rules
 Rob & Big
 Room Raiders
 Ruby Wax Meets... (talktv)
 Run's House
 Scarred
 The Second Half
 The Sharon Osbourne Show (talktv)
 A Shot at Love: The Hangover
 A Shot at Love with Tila Tequila
 SqueezePlay (talktv)
 That's Amore!
 'Til Death Do Us Part: Carmen and Dave
 True Life
 True Love
 Two-A-Days

U-Z
 Vicki Gabereau (talktv)
 The View (talktv)
 Viva La Bam
 W-FIVE (talktv)
 Why Can't I Be You?
 Wrestling Society X
 The X Effect
 Yo Momma

External links
 MTV's official site

MTV (Canada)